Imperial University may refer to:

 Imperial University (Université Impériale) or University of France, the French university re-organisation initiated by Napoleon.
 The  of Japan, founded as Imperial Universities before World War II
 University of Tokyo, known in the late 19th century as first Imperial University and then Tokyo Imperial University 
 Keijō Imperial University, founded under Japanese rule, now part of Seoul National University, Korea
 National Taiwan University, founded under Japanese rule as "Taihoku (Taipei) Imperial University" 
 Imperial University of Vilna; now Vilnius University, Lithuania
 Imperial University of Warsaw; now University of Warsaw, Poland
 Imperial College London, United Kingdom
 Taixue and Guozijian during imperial China
 A former English name for Peking University